This Job's a Trip! is an American reality television show that aired on The Travel Channel produced by Brave St. Productions in association with Vocation Vacations. The series was written & directed by Chris Voos and aired for a single season in 2006.

Premise
Episodes of This Job's a Trip! featured one male and one female participant with nothing in common except their dream job. After brief interviews, each 'job tripper' was taken from their respective locations to somewhere far away for a shared opportunity to try out their dream job. They were given a series of progressive challenges together to see if they could survive in their ideal profession or if they were better suited for their existing day job. The theme of each episode featured a different dream job and two new participants.

In an interview with Catherine Applefeld Olson of CableFax, Patrick Younge explains the show was picked up as part of an overall strategy to help define The Travel Channel as "passion-based network."

External links
IMDB - This Job's a Trip!: https://www.imdb.com/title/tt0770663/
TVtango [Episodes]: http://www.tvtango.com/series/this_jobs_a_trip/episodes
YouTube [Comedian Episode]: https://www.youtube.com/watch?v=jESxpJTj_LE&list=PL2BCEB5B068417782&index=1&feature=plpp_video
 review by Multichannel News 
 announcement by TV Guide 
 LocateTV episode guide 
 Zooraft premier Rafting Guide episode
 http://www.firehouse.com/forums/t81241/
 http://www.emtbravo.net/index.php/topic/11173-this-jobs-a-trip-on-the-travel-channel/
 Bicycling article detailing the third Pro Cyclist episode
 article featured on NOLS - The Leader

2006 American television series debuts
2006 American television series endings
2000s American reality television series
Travel Channel original programming